Yoel Segundo Finol Rivas (born 21 September 1996) is a Venezuelan professional boxer. As an amateur he was awarded a silver medal at the 2016 Summer Olympics after the original silver medalist, Mikhail Aloyan was disqualified following a failed drugs test.

Amateur career

Olympic results
Rio 2016
Round of 32: Defeated Leonel de los Santos (Dominican Republic) 3–0
Round of 16: Defeated Muhammad Ali (Great Britain) 3–0
Quarter-finals: Defeated Mohamed Flissi (Algeria) 3–0
Semi-finals: Defeated by Shakhobidin Zoirov (Uzbekistan) 3–0

Tokyo 2020
Round of 32: Defeated by Ryomei Tanaka (Japan) 5–0

Pan American Games result
Toronto 2015
Preliminaries: Defeated PG Tondo (Canada) 3–0
Quarter-finals: Defeated Yuberjen Martínez (Colombia) 3–0
Semi-finals: Defeated by Joahnys Argilagos (Cuba) 2–1

Professional career
Finol made his professional debut on 6 July 2019 against Jeyson Cervantes. Finol knocked his Colombian opponent down twice en route to a fourth-round technical knockout victory.

On 19 December 2019, Finol fought for a second time as a professional against Carmelo Marmol. Finol was taken the distance as he won via wide unanimous decision after winning every round on each of the three scorecards. Almost a year after his last fight, Finol returned to the ring against Javier Martinez on 17 December 2020. Finol won a comfortable unanimous decision after dominating his Colombian opponent throughout the bout.

Personal life
Finol's elder sister Carolina was married to, and later murdered by former WBA super featherweight and WBC lightweight world champion Edwin Valero.

Professional boxing record

References

External links

1996 births
Living people
People from Mérida, Mérida
Venezuelan male boxers
Olympic boxers of Venezuela
Olympic medalists in boxing
Boxers at the 2016 Summer Olympics
Boxers at the 2020 Summer Olympics
Medalists at the 2016 Summer Olympics
Pan American Games bronze medalists for Venezuela
Pan American Games medalists in boxing
Boxers at the 2015 Pan American Games
South American Games gold medalists for Venezuela
South American Games medalists in boxing
Competitors at the 2018 South American Games
Olympic silver medalists for Venezuela
Flyweight boxers
Medalists at the 2015 Pan American Games
21st-century Venezuelan people